Palimos ng Pag-ibig (International title: Begging for Love) is a Philippine drama series aired by ABS-CBN. which was aired from March 5 to April 20, 2007 and was replaced by Hiram na Mukha. It is a remake of the 1986 film of the same name. It is the first installment of Sineserye Presents.

Origin

Comics
Palimos ng Pag-ibig was first serialized in Komiks before it was translated in the big screen. Nerissa Cabral was the creator and writer of the story.

1986 film

The comic was adapted into a film in 1986 under VIVA Films. It starred Vilma Santos as Fina, Dina Bonnevie as Ditas and Edu Manzano as Rodel.

Plot

In this dog-eat-dog world, people either have to stand up and carve a living for themselves or risk getting trampled by others in the rat race called life. This is the dilemma Ditas (Kristine Hermosa) has faced every day of her life. Born to a destitute family, Ditas has resigned herself to the fact that her life will be a struggle, but she still has the strong resolve to make it in life, no matter what. As such, Ditas will not let her lowly stature in life hamper dreams of a promising future. She makes a living by selling her babies to the highest bidder, a lucrative job that is problem-free until a well-to-do couple approaches her one day and changes the rules of the game.

The picture-perfect couple Rodel (Diether Ocampo) and Fina (Rica Peralejo) are young, good-looking, and rich. The couple couldn't wish for anything more since they seemingly have everything anyone could ever want. With one exception. Both Rodel and Fina are eager to start a family; unfortunately, Fina has a medical condition that prohibits her from bearing children. When they hear rumors about a certain surrogate mother who happens to be Ditas, the couple sees an opportunity to finally fill the void in their lives.

Problems arise when Rodel perceives qualities in Ditas that he deems his wife is lacking. Soon the casual business deal becomes entangled and a more intimate relationship develops between Rodel and Ditas. Now Fina must do everything to make the family whole again even if that means having to beg Rodel for his once undivided love and affection.

Cast and characters

Main cast
 Rica Peralejo as Fina Alcaraz - a successful OBGYN, who ironically helps other women conceive, yet is unable to do it for herself. Various medical complications prohibit her from having a baby, crushing her dreams of having her own kids. A loving wife to her husband, Rodel, she wishes nothing for him but his happiness.
 Kristine Hermosa as Ditas - born to a destitute family, she turns to the business of "baby-making" in order to build a more promising future for herself.
 Diether Ocampo as Rodel Alcaraz - Fina's loyal husband. Albeit a shrewd businessman, Rodel puts his family first and wishes for nothing else but to have a family of his own. But when a medical condition makes Fina barren, Rodel takes the initiative to contract a baby-maker to carry the child his wife cannot.

Supporting cast
 Carlos Agassi as Dick - Rodel's business partner and best friend. He is happy-go-lucky and still strives to live a carefree bachelor's life even though he has a family already.
 Enchong Dee as Job - Fina's younger brother, a one-woman-man who idolizes his sister's husband very much.
 Desiree del Valle as Verna - Ditas' friend. Content with being somebody else's mistress, she paves the way for Ditas and Rodel to meet.
 Eugene Domingo as Mitos - Fina's friend whom she envies for having the "perfect" family. Bubbly and cheerful, she serves as the series' comic relief.
 DJ Durano as Paolo - the wayward man who gets Ditas pregnant and eventually forces her to sell their baby.
 Susan Africa as Tesang - Ditas' mother.
 Helga Krapf as Marichu - Ditas' sister, who incidentally is also Job's girlfriend.
 Yuuya Kadooka as Reggie Alcaraz - Ditas and Rodel's son.

See also
List of dramas of ABS-CBN
List of programs aired by ABS-CBN
Sineserye Presents

References

External links
 

ABS-CBN drama series
2007 Philippine television series debuts
2007 Philippine television series endings
Television series by Dreamscape Entertainment Television
Live action television shows based on films
Filipino-language television shows
Television shows set in the Philippines